Natallia Mikhnevich (née , Kharaneka; born May 25, 1982 in Nevinnomyssk, Russian SFSR) is a Belarusian shot putter.

Career
Mikhnevich finished third at the 2000 World Junior Championships, but first appeared on the international athletics scene at the 2004 Olympics, where she finished fifth. She was also fifth at the World Athletics Final later that year, and in 2005 won the bronze medal. In 2006, she won the World Indoor Championships in Russia with a new personal best indoor throw of 19.84 metres. Her outdoor personal best is 20.70 metres, achieved in July 2008 in Grodno.

She originally won a silver medal in women's shot put at the 2008 Summer Olympics but in November 2016 was stripped of that medal after re-analysis of her drug sample tested positive for prohibited substances methandienone and stanozolol. Mikhnevich had previously served a two-year competition ban for the use of a prohibited substance, Stanozolol, lasting from 12 April 2013 to 11 April 2015.

Since March 2007 she is married to Belarusian shot putter Andrei Mikhnevich.

Achievements

References 

 

1982 births
Living people
Belarusian female shot putters
Athletes (track and field) at the 2004 Summer Olympics
Athletes (track and field) at the 2008 Summer Olympics
Athletes (track and field) at the 2012 Summer Olympics
Athletes (track and field) at the 2016 Summer Olympics
Olympic athletes of Belarus
World Athletics Championships athletes for Belarus
European Athletics Championships medalists
Doping cases in athletics
Belarusian sportspeople in doping cases
Competitors stripped of Summer Olympics medals
Universiade medalists in athletics (track and field)
People from Nevinnomyssk
Universiade gold medalists for Belarus
World Athletics Indoor Championships winners
Competitors at the 2003 Summer Universiade
Medalists at the 2005 Summer Universiade